The 1993–94 season was the seventh time Tennis Borussia Berlin played in the 2. Fußball-Bundesliga, the second highest tier of the German football league system. After 38 league games, Tennis Borussia finished 19th and were relegated. The club had a long run in the DFB-Pokal; making it to the semi-finals where they lost 2–0 away to Rot-Weiss Essen. Mikhail Rusyayev scored 11 of the club's 42 league goals.

1993–94 Tennis Borussia Berlin squad

1993–94 fixtures

Player statistics

Final league position – 19th

References

External links 
 1993–94 Tennis Borussia Berlin season – squad and statistics at fussballdaten.de 

Tennis Borussia Berlin seasons
Tennis Borussia Berlin